Mid Ulster by-election may refer to:

1955 Mid Ulster by-election
1956 Mid Ulster by-election
1969 Mid Ulster by-election
1986 Mid Ulster by-election
2013 Mid Ulster by-election